Senator Bashford may refer to:

Coles Bashford (1816–1878), Wisconsin State Senate
Robert McKee Bashford (1845–1911), Wisconsin State Senate